South West Slammers is an NBL1 West club based in Bunbury, Western Australia. The club fields a team in both the Men's and Women's NBL1 West. The Slammers play their home games at Eaton Recreation Centre and represent Western Australia's South West region.

The club was originally based in the City of Bunbury at Hay Park Recreation Centre (became known as South West Sports Centre in 2002) but relocated north to the suburb of Eaton in 2005 and moved into Eaton Recreation Centre.

Club history

Men's team
1989 saw the formation of the State Basketball League (SBL) with both a men's and women's competition. A team from Bunbury, known as the Slammers, entered the Men's SBL for its inaugural season. The Slammers were a dominant force in the first decade on the league, winning championships in 1995, 1996, 1998 and 1999, while also making grand final appearances in 1991 and 1992. However, after six grand final appearances and four championships in 11 years, things went decidedly south for the team. Following the 2001 season, the Slammers had a disastrous 11-year stretch without making the finals and an overall record of 46–225, which included two winless seasons and two years where they had just the one win.

Following the 2012 season, the Slammers knew they had to do something different to become a force again, and that's where the appointment of Ty Harrelson as player-coach came to fruition. Harrelson outlined a three-year plan that he hoped would set up the Slammers for long-term success. As a result, the Slammers played finals basketball in 2013, 2014 and 2015. The three-year plan culminated in making the 2015 MSBL Grand Final behind the likes of Harrelson, Clive Weeden, Tre Nichols, Brian Voelkel and Trent Worthington. In their first grand final since 1999, the Slammers were defeated 105–75 by the Joondalup Wolves.

Women's team
In 1992, a Slammers women's team entered the Women's SBL. The team struggled over their first three seasons, as they finished in ninth place each year while registering a 6–14 record in both 1992 and 1993, and a 3–17 record in 1994. The team subsequently exited the league following the 1994 season and had a five-year hiatus, returning in 2000. In 2012, after 15 seasons of not playing in the finals, the Slammers finished in third place with a 15–7 record. They went on to reach the WSBL Grand Final, where they defeated the Rockingham Flames 85–48 to win their maiden championship.

In 2021, the SBL was rebranded as NBL1 West.

Accolades

Women
Championships: 1 (2012)
Grand Final appearances: 1 (2012)
Minor premierships: Nil

Men
Championships: 4 (1995, 1996, 1998, 1999)
Grand Final appearances: 7 (1991, 1992, 1995, 1996, 1998, 1999, 2015)
Minor premierships: 3 (1992, 1996, 1999)

References

External links
Official website

Basketball teams established in 1989
1989 establishments in Australia
Basketball teams in Western Australia
NBL1 West teams